Armored Car Robbery is a 1950 American film noir starring Charles McGraw, Adele Jergens, and William Talman.

Directed by Richard Fleischer, Armored Car Robbery is a heist movie, a subgenre of crime-based films. It tells the story of a well-planned robbery of cash from an armored car when it stops at a sports stadium. The heist goes awry and a tough Los Angeles cop sets off in hot pursuit of the culprits.

Plot
Mastermind Dave Purvis is a professional criminal who devises a scheme to rob an armored car on its last pickup of the day. He recruits Benny McBride, who brings Mapes & Foster to complete the gang of thieves.

Benny needs money because his wife Yvonne, a striptease dancer, has lost interest in him and is seeing another man. Unbeknownst to Benny, the man she is two-timing him with is Purvis.

The robbery itself, at Wrigley Field in Los Angeles, begins as planned but goes wrong when a passing police patrol car intervenes. Purvis kills one of the police officers from the patrol car and he and his fellow robbers make their getaway. Lt. Jim Cordell, the dead policeman's partner, takes it upon himself to bring in his partner's killer and throws himself into the case, assisted by a rookie officer, Danny Ryan.

Meanwhile, Purvis's gang unravels bit by bit as distrust and paranoia begins to build. Benny, wounded by police during the heist, is killed by Purvis as he demands his share of the loot from the robbery and attempts to seek medical help. Foster is killed by the police as the three attempt escape. After Mapes gets away, tries to meet Yvonne at the Burly Q where she works, intending to use her as a means to find Purvis, who has kept all the loot for himself. The waiting police, however, arrest Mapes at the Burly Q and learn Purvis's identity.

Ryan goes undercover disguised as Mapes in order to glean information from Yvonne, who knows of Mapes but has never met him. Purvis interrupts and captures Ryan. He is shot and severely wounded while escaping, but manages to inform Lt. Cordell that Purvis and Yvonne are leaving the country by chartered airplane from Los Angeles Metropolitan Airport.

Lt. Cordell and his team corner Purvis and Yvonne at the airport, and Purvis is crushed by a landing plane as he tries to escape across the runway.

Cast
 Charles McGraw as Lieutenant Jim Cordell
 Adele Jergens as Yvonne LeDoux
 William Talman as Dave Purvis
 Douglas Fowley as Benny McBride
 Steve Brodie as Al Mapes
 Don McGuire as Detective Danny Ryan
 Don Haggerty as detective driving final pursuit car
 James Flavin as Lieutenant Phillips
 Gene Evans as William 'Ace' Foster

Production
The film was based on a story by Charles Pete and Richard Carroll about a $500,000 robbery, based on a true story - the 1934 robbery at Rubel Ice Company. Originally called Gravesend Bay it was sold to RKO in March 1949. Robert Ryan was meant to play John Ryan.

The studio retitled it Code No 3.

In August 1949 Earl Felton was assigned to write the script. Herman Schlom was producer and Richard Fleischer was to direct.

Charles McGraw was cast in December 1949.

The film was filmed on location in Los Angeles, California over 16 days. Locations include Wrigley Field and the Metropolitan Airport.

Reception

Critical response
Variety magazine gave the film a mixed review, calling it an okay film, and wrote, "RKO has concocted an okay cops-and-robbers melodrama ...[and] McGraw, Don McGuire and James Flavin, as cops, do very well. Talman and his cohorts put plenty of color into their heavy assignments. Adele Jergens attracts as a stripteaser and Talman's romantic interest".

Time Out Film Guide review lauded the film and called it "a model of its time". They wrote, "Almost documentary in its account of the heist that goes wrong and the police procedures that are set in motion, making excellent use of LA locations, it relies on superb high contrast lighting to meld reality into the characteristic noir look".

Noir analysis
According to American studies and film professor, Bob Porfirio, Armored Car Robbery possesses the "film noir visual style" of the many RKO crime and suspense films of the early 1950s, such as: high-contrast photography integrating studio and location shooting, expressionistic lighting, deep focus, and haunting music (by Roy Webb).

Film critic Roger Fristoe believed director Richard Fleischer pushed the boundaries of the Motion Picture Production Code.  One edict was,  "Methods of crime shall not be explicitly presented or detailed in a manner calculated to...inspire imitation." Armored Car Robbery, however, had a blunt title, explicit violence and a detailed account of the planning and execution of the crime.  As such, even though the criminals are caught, Armored Car Robbery tested the waters and helped set the stage for other films noir and heist films like The Killing (1956), which shares some similarities.

DVD release
Warner Bros. released the film on DVD on July 13, 2010, in its Film Noir Classic Collection, Vol. 5.

References

External links
 
 
 
 
Armored Car Robbery at Letterbox DVD

1950 films
1950s crime thriller films
American crime thriller films
American black-and-white films
American heist films
1950s English-language films
Film noir
Films about organized crime in the United States
Films set in Los Angeles
RKO Pictures films
Films directed by Richard Fleischer
Films scored by Roy Webb
1950s police films
1950s heist films
Films scored by Paul Sawtell
1950s American films